McGuire-Setzer House is a historic home located near Mocksville, Davie County, North Carolina. The original section of the double-pen log building was built about 1825, with a frame section added about 1835.  The dwelling is sheathed in weatherboard and is in a vernacular Federal style.  It features gable end brick chimneys and rests on a stone foundation.  Also on the property is a contributing kitchen building.

It was added to the National Register of Historic Places in 1992.

References

Houses on the National Register of Historic Places in North Carolina
Federal architecture in North Carolina
Houses completed in 1835
Houses in Davie County, North Carolina
National Register of Historic Places in Davie County, North Carolina